Agnieszka Radwańska won the title, defeating Anastasia Pavlyuchenkova in the final, 6–4, 6–1.

Ágnes Szávay was the defending champion, but chose not to participate.

Seeds 

  Anastasia Pavlyuchenkova (final)
  Agnieszka Radwańska (champion)
  Chan Yung-jan (semifinals)
  Timea Bacsinszky (first round)
  Caroline Wozniacki (third round)
  Ayumi Morita (first round)
  Alisa Kleybanova (first round)
  Raluca Olaru (first round)
  Mihaela Buzărnescu (third round)
  Alizé Cornet (quarterfinals)
  Sorana Cîrstea (third round)
  Julia Cohen (second round)
  Youlia Fedossova (quarterfinals)
  Kristina Antoniychuk (third round)
  Kristína Kučová (second round)
  Teliana Pereira (third round)

Draw

Finals

Top half

Section 1

Section 2

Bottom half

Section 3

Section 4

Sources 
 Draw

Girls' Singles
French Open, 2006 Girls' Singles